Duisburg dialect (Duisburg dialect: Düsbergsch Platt) is an extinct dialect that was spoken in the German city of Duisburg. It was part of the broader South Guelderish (Cleverlands) dialect group – the easternmost of the Low Franconian languages. These languages, including Dutch, were spoken along the lower Rhine in the Netherlands and central western Germany. Through historical circumstances, Duisburg dialect – along with the other South Guelderish dialects – became more and more influenced by Standard German and, in particular, Central German dialects.

The dialect was located close to the northern side of the Uerdingen line, a linguistic isogloss within the continental West Germanic languages in Europe, separating  dialects that preserve the -k sound in the first person singular pronoun word "ik" (north of the line) from dialects in which the word final -k has changed to a final -ch in the word "ich" (south of the line). That sound shift is the one that progressed the farthest north among the consonant shifts that characterize High German and Low German/Low Saxon dialects. The line passes through Belgium, the Netherlands and Germany.

During the 20th century, a Ruhr/Lower Rhine dialect, with traces of the old dialect in grammar, syntax and vocabulary gradually became dominant in the Duisburg region. The Duisburg dialect became extinct in spoken form, between the 1950s and 1970s.

Examples 

Duisburg dialect:
 
 
 
 
 

Dutch:
 
 
 
 
 

 
 
 
 
 

English:
 Wellem van der Weppe was years old when he took a wife. He has always been
 a bit careful in all matters.
 "Now I am free and unmarried", he said when he was forty-five years old.
 "now I know what I have, but what I will get when I am saddled with a wife, 
 that I do not know by far yet!"

German:

Literature 
  Georg Böllert: Ut Old Düsberg’s Tid, Georg Böllert, Duisburg, 1934
  Heinrich Neuse: Studien zur niederheinischen Dialektgeographie in den Kreisen Rees, Dinslaken, Hamborn, Mülheim, Duisburg  in: DDG 8, Marburg, Friedrich (1915)

See also 
 Ruhr Language ("Ruhrdeutsch")

References

Culture in Duisburg
Ruhr
German dialects
Dutch dialects
North Rhine-Westphalia
Languages of Germany
City colloquials
Languages extinct in the 20th century